Diarabana is a town in north-western Ivory Coast. It is the seat of the sub-prefecture of Bobi-Diarabana in Séguéla Department, Worodougou Region, Woroba District.

Diarabana was a commune until March 2012, when it became one of 1126 communes nationwide that were abolished.

Notes

Populated places in Woroba District
Former communes of Ivory Coast
Populated places in Worodougou